The diplomatic network of the Portuguese Republic is shaped by both its current interests in Europe and its historical linkages to its former colonies in Africa, South America, and Asia. This is reflected in its choice of cities in Asia where Portugal has opened missions – there are Portuguese missions in Dili, Macau, and Panaji. Following the restoration of diplomatic relations with Indonesia in 1999, broken after the 1975 Indonesian invasion of East Timor, there is now an embassy in Jakarta.

Circa 2006, the Portuguese government announced plans to close many of its consular missions, particularly in France and the United States, where there are consulates in comparatively small cities such as New Bedford and Providence whose links to Portugal are based on receiving Luso-American immigrants in the nineteenth century. This met with opposition from many people of Portuguese origin in Massachusetts and Rhode Island, as well as Congressman Barney Frank.

The former Foreign Minister, Luís Amado, proposed reprioritising its diplomatic network in order to deepen diplomatic engagement in Asia, Africa and the Middle East.  He  proposed closing  missions in Bosnia and Herzegovina, Bulgaria, Croatia, Cyprus, Estonia, Kenya, Lithuania, Latvia, Malta, Peru, Serbia, Slovenia, Ukraine, and Uruguay, and opening missions in Bahrain, Botswana, Equatorial Guinea, Jordan, Kuwait, Malaysia, Namibia, New Zealand, Philippines, Qatar, Syria, United Arab Emirates and Vietnam.

Current missions

Africa

Americas

Asia

Europe

Oceania

Multilateral organisations

Gallery

Closed missions

Africa

Asia

Europe

References

Notes

See also
Foreign relations of Portugal
Ministry of Foreign Affairs of Portugal

 
Portugal
Diplomatic missions